Ludmila Formanová (born 2 January 1974) is a former Czech middle-distance runner who specialized in the 800 metres. She was born in Čáslav.

In 1999 she broke Maria de Lurdes Mutola's winning streak at the World Indoor Championships, and won in a championship record (CR) of 1:56.90. In August she ran in a personal best time of 1:56.56 (August 11) and won the World Championships (August 24).

She officially finished her active career on 2 May 2007.

International competitions

References 

 

1974 births
Living people
People from Čáslav
Czech female middle-distance runners
Olympic athletes of the Czech Republic
Athletes (track and field) at the 1996 Summer Olympics
Athletes (track and field) at the 2000 Summer Olympics
World Athletics Championships athletes for the Czech Republic
World Athletics Championships medalists
World Athletics Indoor Championships winners
World Athletics Indoor Championships medalists
World Athletics Championships winners
Sportspeople from the Central Bohemian Region